Anan or ANAN may refer to:

People
 Anan (name)

Places
 Anan, Haute-Garonne, a commune in the Haute-Garonne département, France
 Anan, Nagano, a town in Nagano, Japan
 Anan, Tokushima, a city in Tokushima, Japan

Other uses
 Anan (film), a Malayalam-language drama film
 Anan (magazine), a Japanese magazine
 Ananites, the first Karaites
 Association of National Accountants of Nigeria (ANAN), a professional association

See also
 Annan (disambiguation)
 Chok anan, mango